Cheung Ka-fai is a Hong Kong film editor and actor.

Filmography

Film editor

 A Better Tomorrow 2 (1987)
 Thunder Cops II (1989)
 The First Time is the Last Time (1989)
 Mortuary Blues (1990)
 Center Stage (1991)
 Super Lady Cop (1992)
Police Story 3 (a.k.a. Supercop) (1992)
 The Black Panther Warriors (1993)
 Once a Cop (1993)
 City Hunter (1993)
 In the Heat of Summer (1994)
 Twenty Something (1994)
 The Third Full Moon (1994)
 Touch of Evil (1995)
 Happy Hour (1995)
 Lost Boys in Wonderland (1995)
 Power Connection (1995)
 Thunderbolt (1995)
 The Christ of Nanjing (1995)
 Trilogy of Lust (1995)
 Yes Madam 5 (1996)
 What a Wonderful World (1996)
 Big Bullet (1996)
 The God of Cookery (1996)
 Black Mask (1996)
 On Fire (1996)
 Thunder Cop (1996)
 Downtown Torpedoes (1997)
 Lawyer Lawyer (1997)
 Task Force (1997)
 Killing Me Tenderly (1997)
 L - O - V - E ..... LOVE (1997)
 Techno Warriors (1997)
 God.com (1998)
 The Lucky Guy (1998)
 Tricky King (1998)
 Raped by An Angel 3: Sexual Fantasy of the Chief Executive (1998)
 Extreme Crisis (1998)
 Nude Fear (1998)
 Sex and Zen III (1998)
 Hitman (1998)
 Raped by an Angel 2: The Uniform Fan (1998)
 Bio Zombie (1998)
 The Love and Sex of the Eastern Hollywood (1998)
 PR Girls (1998)
 Hong Kong Spice Gals (1999)
 Sunshine Cops (1999)
 X Imp (1999)
 Afraid of Nothing, the Jobless King (1999)
 The Lord of Amusement (1999)
 The King of Debt Collecting Agent (1999)
 Gorgeous (1999)
 Bullets Over Summer (1999)
 The Mistress (1999)
 Wan Chai Empress (1999)
 Gen-X Cops (1999)
 Rave Fever (1999)
 The Kingdom of Mob (1999)
 Eternal Love (2000)
 Skyline Cruisers (2000)
 A War Named Desire (2000)
 Gen-Y Cops (2000)
 True Love (2000)
 Twilight Garden (2000)
 Roaring Wheels (2000)
 Juliet in Love (2000)
 When I Fall in Love... with Both (2000)
 Wishful Milenio (2000)
 Bruce Law Stunts (2000)
 Life (2000)
 The Legend of the Flying Swordsman (2000)
 Chinese Heroes (2001
 Fighting for Love (2001)
 Dead End (2001)
 Bakery Amour (2001)
 2002 (2001)
 Stolen Love (2001)
 Funeral March (2001)
 Midnight Fly (2001)
 Final Romance (2001)
 Feel 100% II (2001)
 Extreme Challenge (2001)
 Thou Shall Not Commit (2001)
 Visible Secret II (2002)
 Dry Wood Fierce Fire (2002)
 Demi-Haunted (2002)
 Golden Chicken (2002)
 So Close (2002)
 Summer Breeze of Love (2002)
 Love Undercover (2002)
 The Mummy, Aged 19 (2002)
 Anna in Kungfuland (2003)
 Naked Ambition (2003)
 Love Undercover 2: Love Mission (2003)
 Lost in Time (2003)
 Golden Chicken 2 (2003)
 Heroic Duo (2003)
 Good Times, Bed Times (2003)
 The Miracle Box (2004)
 The Twins Effect II (2004)
 Heat Team (2004)
 Explosive City (2004)
 The White Dragon (2004)
 A-1 (2004)
 Leaving Me, Loving You (2004)
 One Nite in Mongkok (2004)
 Love On the Rocks (2004)
 SPL: Sha Po Lang (2005)
 House of Fury (2005)
 We Are Family (2006)
 Dragon Tiger Gate (2006)
 Men Suddenly in Black 2 (2006)
 Silk (2006)
 Mr. 3 Minutes (2006)
 Ming Ming (2007)
 Simply Actors (2007)
 Flash Point (2007)
 Anna & Anna (2007)
 Three Kingdoms: Resurrection of the Dragon (2008)
 Ip Man (2008)
 Shinjuku Incident (2009)
 Murderer (2009)
 Wu Dang (2012)
 A Moment of Love (2013)
 The Monkey King (2014)
 Europe Raiders (2018) - supervising editor
 The Wandering Earth (2019)

Actor
 The Inspector Wears Skirts IV (1992)
 PR Girls'' (1998)

External links

Hong Kong film editors
Hong Kong male actors
Living people
Year of birth missing (living people)